Rajwinder Kaur (born 26 August 1984) is a player for the Indian Women's Hockey Team. She played with the team when it won the Silver medal at the 2006 Commonwealth Games. In November 2011, she married Gurwinder Singh, a Chandigarh-based engineer.

References

External links 
Probables List
Blockbuster Inspires Hockey Team

Field hockey players from Haryana
Living people
Punjabi people
Indian female field hockey players
Commonwealth Games silver medallists for India
Field hockey players at the 2006 Commonwealth Games
1984 births
Asian Games medalists in field hockey
Field hockey players at the 2006 Asian Games
Asian Games bronze medalists for India
Sportswomen from Haryana
Commonwealth Games medallists in field hockey
21st-century Indian women
21st-century Indian people
Medalists at the 2006 Asian Games
Medallists at the 2006 Commonwealth Games